The Boy with the X-Ray Eyes is a 1999 adventure/fantasy film directed by Jeff Burr. It stars Bryan Neal as Andy, a teenager who one day finds a special pair of powerful glasses and not long after is visited by aliens who need his help in order to retrieve a lost item that could destroy Earth.

References

External links

1999 films
1999 fantasy films
American fantasy adventure films
Films directed by Jeff Burr
1990s English-language films
1990s American films